Drive is the second studio album produced by the electronic dance music artist Gareth Emery, released on 1 April 2014. The album is the follow up to Emery's first studio album, Northern Lights, released in 2010. The album features vocals from Christina Novelli who also sang on "Concrete Angel". Also featured are Gavin Beach, Ben Gold, LJ Ayrten, Asia Whiteacre, Krewella, Bo Bruce and Emery's sister Roxanne Emery.

Track listing

Music videos
 "U" 
 "Dynamite" 
 "Long Way Home"

References

Gareth Emery albums
2014 albums